Raymond d’Audemar Orpen (31 August 1837 – 9 January 1930) was an Irish cleric in the 20th century.

He was a curate at Rathronan and then Adare before becoming the Incumbent of Tralee. He was Archdeacon of Ardfert until his ordination to the episcopate as Bishop of Limerick, Ardfert and Aghadoe in 1907. He retired in 1921.

References

1837 births
1930 deaths
Alumni of Trinity College Dublin
Archdeacons of Ardfert
20th-century Anglican bishops in Ireland
Bishops of Limerick, Ardfert and Aghadoe
Diocese of Limerick, Ardfert and Aghadoe